Tilak Shekar (born March 1982), mononymously known as Tilak, is an Indian actor who appears mainly in Kannada-language films. He is a model-turned-actor and is known for his negative roles in Kannada movies. He was one of the 13 housemates in the first season of Bigg Boss Kannada aired in April 2013.
Thilak is Appreciated for his act in the movie Ugramm. He played the lead role in the horror thriller Karvva (2016).

Filmography

Films

Television

References

External links
 
Tilak makes a mark

1982 births
Indian male film actors
Living people
Indian male models
Kannada male actors
Male actors in Kannada cinema
21st-century Indian male actors
Participants in Indian reality television series
Male actors from Bangalore
Bigg Boss Kannada contestants